Canal 11 is a nationwide television station in Honduras. It started broadcasting in November 1996 and it is a Grupo Continental company.

Slogans
 1996 - 2010 La señal de la nación (The sign of the nation)
 2010 - Present Vive con nosotros (Live with us)

External links
Official site

Television in Honduras
Spanish-language television stations
Television channels and stations established in 1996
1996 establishments in Honduras